Filling may refer to:

 a food mixture used for stuffing
 Frosting used between layers of a cake
 Dental restoration
 Symplectic filling, a kind of cobordism in mathematics
 Part of the leather crusting process

See also
 Fill (disambiguation)